Baldwin V (1177 or 1178August 1186) was King of Jerusalem who reigned together with his uncle Baldwin IV from 1183 to 1185 and, after his uncle's death, as the sole king from 1185 to his death. Baldwin IV's leprosy meant that he could not have children, and so he spent his reign grooming various relatives to succeed him. Finally his nephew was chosen, and Baldwin IV had him crowned as co-king in order to sideline the child's unpopular stepfather, Guy of Lusignan. When Baldwin IV died, Count Raymond III of Tripoli assumed government on behalf of the child king. He died of unknown causes, and was succeeded by his mother, Sibylla, who then made Guy king.

Background
Baldwin of Montferrat was born in December 1177 or January 1178 to Sibylla, sister of King Baldwin IV of Jerusalem, after whom he was named. His father, William of Montferrat, had died in June 1177. Though only 16, the king was not expected to live long, nor could he marry and have children, because he had contracted leprosy and was growing weaker. William had thus been expected to succeed him. By July 1178, the king recognized his sister as his new heir presumptive. Her son, Baldwin of Montferrat, followed her in the line of succession.

Baldwin IV chose Guy of Lusignan as his new brother-in-law in early 1180. Baldwin IV initially intended Guy to become the next king, but soon Baldwin IV realized that his brother-in-law's unpopularity with the barons of the Kingdom of Jerusalem and rulers of the neighbouring Crusader states, Prince Bohemond III of Antioch and Count Raymond III of Tripoli, made him a poor candidate.

Kingship

In 1183 Baldwin IV summoned a council to discuss who would be an acceptable alternative to Guy. Sibylla's supporters were not present, while her and Baldwin IV's younger half-sister Isabella and Isabella's husband, Humphrey IV of Toron, were not viable candidates due to being besieged in Kerak by the Egyptian ruler Saladin. Agnes of Courtenay, mother of Sibylla and Baldwin IV, suggested that Sibylla's son should be made co-king. Agnes may have acted to foil the ambitions of Raymond of Tripoli, who also had a claim to the throne. As the boy had the next best claim after his mother, Agnes's proposal was widely accepted. Baldwin V was acclaimed, crowned, and anointed in the Church of the Holy Sepulchre on 20 November 1183, and he received homage from all the barons except his stepfather, Guy.

It became apparent in late 1184 or early 1185 that Baldwin IV was dying. He summoned the High Court to select a regent for his nephew. Both the king and the barons wanted to prevent Guy from ruling in the name of Baldwin V. They appointed Raymond, but made Joscelin of Courtenay the child's guardian. Joscelin was Baldwin V's granduncle with no claim to the throne, and so the High Court trusted him, unlike Raymond, to keep the king safe.

After the question of regency was settled, Baldwin V and Raymond received homage as king and regent, respectively. The young king then took part in a solemn crown-wearing ceremony in the Church of the Holy Sepulchre at his uncle's command. From there the boy was carried to banquet on the shoulders of Balian of Ibelin, stepfather of Baldwin IV and Sibylla's half-sister, Isabella, thus signifying that the succession arrangement had the support of the potential contender's family. Baldwin IV had died by 16 May 1185, leaving Baldwin V as the sole king.

The kingdom faced no external threats during Baldwin V's reign, as Raymond succeeded in procuring a truce from Saladin. Western princes refused to come to aid, likely because they could not be offered the crown but, at most, the prospect of a temporary rule on behalf of a minor. Only the king's paternal grandfather, experienced crusader Marquess William V of Montferrat, moved to the East, ensuring that the child's rights would be upheld. Guy continued to resent not being regent for his own stepson.

Death

In late August 1186, Baldwin V died of unknown causes in Acre. Contemporary chronicler William of Newburgh, hostile to the count of Tripoli, wrote that Raymond poisoned the child, but that is unlikely because the king was in the care of his granduncle Joscelin of Courtenay. He was succeeded by his mother, Sibylla, who then invested Guy with kingship. The Templars took Baldwin's body to Jerusalem, and he was buried in the Church of the Holy Sepulchre along with six of his predecessors. An elaborate tomb, likely commissioned by Sibylla, survived until 1808, when it was destroyed in a fire.

References

Sources

 
 

1177 births
1186 deaths
12th-century kings of Jerusalem
Aleramici
Burials at the Church of the Holy Sepulchre
Kings of Jerusalem
Medieval child monarchs
Monarchs who died as children